The 1975 Chicago Bears season was their 56th regular season in the National Football League. The team matched their 4–10 record from 1974, in the first season under head coach Jack Pardee.

The 1975 Bears are the only NFL team to have been outscored by 25 points six different times during a 14-game season, a record for futility that has that has only been matched once under the current 16-game format.

Offseason

NFL Draft

Roster

Regular season

Schedule

Season summary

Week 2

Week 8

Standings

Awards and records

References 

Chicago Bears
Chicago Bears seasons
Chicago Bears